Dumino is a rural locality (a village) in Lyubomirovskoye Rural Settlement, Sheksninsky District, Vologda Oblast, Russia. The population was 46 as of 2002.

Geography 
Dumino is located 31 km southeast of Sheksna (the district's administrative centre) by road. Nokshino is the nearest rural locality.

References 

Rural localities in Sheksninsky District